The 2011 Nasarawa State gubernatorial election was the 4th gubernatorial election of Nasarawa State. Held on April 26, 2011, the Congress for Progressive Change nominee Umaru Tanko Al-Makura won the election, defeating Aliyu Doma of the People's Democratic Party.

Results 
A total of 9 candidates contested in the election. Umaru Tanko Al-Makura from the Congress for Progressive Change won the election, defeating Aliyu Doma from the People's Democratic Party. Valid votes was 674,014.

References 

Nasarawa State gubernatorial elections
Nasarawa gubernatorial
April 2011 events in Nigeria